Aliabad (also Romanized as ‘Alīābād) is a village in Howmeh-ye Sharqi Rural District, in the Central District of Izeh County, Khuzestan Province, Iran. At the 2006 census, its population was 276, in 41 families.

References 

Populated places in Izeh County